Andrei Tarkovsky (1932–1986) was a Soviet film director, screenwriter and film theorist. During his career he received numerous awards, both for individual films and in recognition of his work. This list is most likely incomplete as only awards and nominations have been included that are confirmed either by the award-giving organization or by reliable third-party sources.

Film awards and nominations

Cannes Film Festival

Venice Film Festival

San Francisco International Film Festival

Jussi Award

Ente David di Donatello

Fantasporto

BAFTA Awards

Other awards and honors

Government of the Soviet Union

See also
 Andrei Tarkovsky filmography

Notes
A: For example, the Internet Movie Database (IMDb) lists several awards that are not included in this list. According to IMDb, Solaris won a FIPRESCI prize at the 1972 Cannes Film Festival, what is in conflict with the official information given by the Cannes Film Festival. Other awards on the IMDb list without official confirmation are a Best Foreign Film award by the French Syndicate of Cinema Critics for Andrei Rublev in 1971 and a Golden Spike for The Sacrifice at the Valladolid International Film Festival in 1986.

References

External links
 *
 Nostalghia.com – An Andrei Tarkovsky Information Site

Andrei Tarkovsky